Aurskog Sparebank is a Norwegian savings bank, headquartered in Aurskog, Norway. The banks main market is the Romerike district of Akershus. The banks equity certificates was listed on Oslo Stock Exchange in 1998.

Aurskog Sparebank is one of the owners of Eika Gruppen.

External links
 Official Website

References

Banks of Norway
Companies based in Akershus
Banks established in 1846
Companies listed on the Oslo Stock Exchange
Norwegian companies established in 1846